

Events

Pre-1600
 762 – Baghdad is founded.
1419 – First Defenestration of Prague: A crowd of radical Hussites kill seven members of the Prague city council.
1502 – Christopher Columbus lands at Guanaja in the Bay Islands off the coast of Honduras during his fourth voyage.

1601–1900
1609 – Beaver Wars: At Ticonderoga (now Crown Point, New York), Samuel de Champlain shoots and kills two Iroquois chiefs on behalf of his native allies. 
1619 – In Jamestown, Virginia, the first Colonial European representative assembly in the Americas, the Virginia General Assembly, convenes for the first time.
1627 – An earthquake kills about 5,000 people in Gargano, Italy.
1635 – Eighty Years' War: The Siege of Schenkenschans begins; Frederick Henry, Prince of Orange, begins the recapture of the strategically important fortress from the Spanish Army.
1645 – English Civil War: Scottish Covenanter forces under the Earl of Leven launch the Siege of Hereford, a remaining Royalist stronghold.
1656 – The Battle of Warsaw ends with a Swedish-Brandenburger victory over a larger Polish-Lithuanian force.
1676 – Nathaniel Bacon issues the "Declaration of the People of Virginia", beginning Bacon's Rebellion against the rule of Governor William Berkeley.
1729 – Founding of Baltimore, Maryland. 
1733 – The first Masonic Grand Lodge in the future United States is constituted in Massachusetts. 
1756 – In Saint Petersburg, Bartolomeo Rastrelli presents the newly built Catherine Palace to Empress Elizabeth and her courtiers.
1811 – Father Miguel Hidalgo y Costilla, leader of the Mexican insurgency, is executed by the Spanish in Chihuahua City, Mexico.
1859 – First ascent of Grand Combin, one of the highest summits in the Alps.
1863 – American Indian Wars: Representatives of the United States and tribal leaders including Chief Pocatello (of the Shoshone)  sign the Treaty of Box Elder.
1864 – American Civil War: Battle of the Crater: Union forces attempt to break Confederate lines at Petersburg, Virginia by exploding a large bomb under their trenches.
1865 – The steamboat Brother Jonathan sinks off the coast of Crescent City, California, killing 225 passengers, the deadliest shipwreck on the Pacific Coast of the U.S. at the time.
1866 – Armed Confederate veterans in New Orleans riot against a meeting of Radical Republicans, killing 48 people and injuring another 100.
1871 – The Staten Island Ferry Westfield'''s boiler explodes, killing over 85 people.
1901–present
1912 – Japan's Emperor Meiji dies and is succeeded by his son Yoshihito, who is now known as the Emperor Taishō.
1916 – The Black Tom explosion in New York Harbor kills four and destroys some $20,000,000 worth of military goods.
1930 – In Montevideo, Uruguay wins the first FIFA World Cup. 
1932 – Premiere of Walt Disney's Flowers and Trees, the first cartoon short to use Technicolor and the first Academy Award winning cartoon short.
Most die during the following four days, until an aircraft notices the survivors.
1956 – A joint resolution of the U.S. Congress is signed by President Dwight D. Eisenhower, authorizing In God We Trust as the U.S. national motto.
1962 – The Trans-Canada Highway, the then longest national highway in the world, is officially opened.
1965 – U.S. President Lyndon B. Johnson signs the Social Security Act of 1965 into law, establishing Medicare and Medicaid. 
1966 – England defeats West Germany to win the 1966 FIFA World Cup at Wembley Stadium after extra time.
1969 – Vietnam War: US President Richard Nixon makes an unscheduled visit to South Vietnam and meets with President Nguyễn Văn Thiệu and U.S. military commanders. 
1971 – Apollo program: On Apollo 15, David Scott and James Irwin on the Apollo Lunar Module Falcon land on the Moon with the first Lunar Rover.
  1971   – An All Nippon Airways Boeing 727 and a Japanese Air Force F-86 collide over Morioka, Iwate, Japan killing 162.
1974 – Watergate scandal: U.S. President Richard Nixon releases subpoenaed White House recordings after being ordered to do so by the Supreme Court of the United States.
1975 – Jimmy Hoffa disappears from the parking lot of the Machus Red Fox restaurant in Bloomfield Hills, Michigan, a suburb of Detroit, at about 2:30 p.m. He is never seen or heard from again.
1978 – The 730: Okinawa Prefecture changes its traffic on the right-hand side of the road to the left-hand side.
1980 – Vanuatu gains independence.
  1980   – Israel's Knesset passes the Jerusalem Law.
1981 – As many as 50,000 demonstrators, mostly women and children, took to the streets in Łódź to protest food ration shortages in Communist Poland.
1990 – Ian Gow, Conservative Member of Parliament, is assassinated at his home by IRA terrorists in a car bombing after he assured the group that the British government would never surrender to them.
2003 – In Mexico, the last 'old style' Volkswagen Beetle rolls off the assembly line.
2006 – The world's longest running music show Top of the Pops'' is broadcast for the last time on BBC Two. The show had aired for 42 years.
2011 – Marriage of Queen Elizabeth II's eldest granddaughter Zara Phillips to former rugby union footballer Mike Tindall.
2012 – A train fire kills 32 passengers and injures 27 on the Tamil Nadu Express in Andhra Pradesh, India.
  2012   – A power grid failure in Delhi leaves more than 300 million people without power in northern India.
2014 – Twenty killed and 150 are trapped after a landslide in Maharashtra, India.
2020 – NASA's Mars 2020 mission was launched on an Atlas V rocket from Cape Canaveral Air Force Station.

Births

Pre-1600
1470 – Hongzhi, emperor of the Ming dynasty (d. 1505)
1511 – Giorgio Vasari, Italian painter, historian, and architect (d. 1574)
1549 – Ferdinando I de' Medici, Grand Duke of Tuscany (d. 1609)

1601–1900
1641 – Regnier de Graaf, Dutch physician and anatomist (d. 1673)
1751 – Maria Anna Mozart, Austrian pianist (d. 1829)
1763 – Samuel Rogers, English poet and art collector (d. 1855)
1781 – Maria Aletta Hulshoff, Dutch feminist and pamphleteer (d. 1846)
1809 – Charles Chiniquy, Canadian-American priest and theologian (d. 1899)
1818 – Emily Brontë, English novelist and poet (d. 1848)
  1818   – Jan Heemskerk, Dutch lawyer and politician, 16th and 19th Prime Minister of the Netherlands (d. 1897)
1825 – Chaim Aronson, Lithuanian engineer and author (d. 1893)
1832 – George Lemuel Woods, American lawyer, judge, and politician, 3rd Governor of Oregon (d. 1890)
1855 – Georg Wilhelm von Siemens, German-Swiss businessman (d. 1919)
1857 – Thorstein Veblen, American economist and sociologist (d. 1929)
1859 – Henry Simpson Lunn, English minister and humanitarian, founded Lunn Poly (d. 1939)
1862 – Nikolai Yudenich, Russian general (d. 1933)
1863 – Henry Ford, American engineer and businessman, founded the Ford Motor Company (d. 1947)
1872 – Princess Clémentine of Belgium (d. 1955)
1881 – Smedley Butler, American general, Medal of Honor recipient (d. 1940)
1890 – Casey Stengel, American baseball player and manager (d. 1975)
1898 – Henry Moore, English sculptor and illustrator (d. 1986)
1899 – Gerald Moore, English pianist (d. 1987)

1901–present
1901 – Alfred Lépine, Canadian ice hockey player and coach (d. 1955)
1904 – Salvador Novo, Mexican poet and playwright (d. 1974)
1909 – C. Northcote Parkinson, English historian and author (d. 1993)
1910 – Edgar de Evia, Mexican-American photographer (d. 2003)
1913 – Lou Darvas, American soldier and cartoonist (d. 1987)
1914 – Michael Morris, 3rd Baron Killanin, Irish journalist and author, 6th President of the International Olympic Committee (d. 1999)
1920 – Walter Schuck, German lieutenant and pilot (d. 2015)
1921 – Grant Johannesen, American pianist and educator (d. 2005)
1922 – Henry W. Bloch, American banker and businessman, co-founded H&R Block (d. 2019)
1925 – Stan Stennett, Welsh actor and trumpet player (d. 2013)
  1925   – Alexander Trocchi, Scottish author and poet (d. 1984)
1926 – Betye Saar, American artist 
1927 – Richard Johnson, English actor, producer, and screenwriter (d. 2015)
  1927   – Pete Schoening, American mountaineer (d. 2004)
  1927   – Victor Wong, American actor (d. 2001)
1928 – Joe Nuxhall, American baseball player and sportscaster (d. 2007)
1929 – Sid Krofft, Canadian-American puppeteer and producer
1931 – Dominique Lapierre, French historian and author
  1931   – Marina Popovich, Soviet pilot, engineer and military officer (d. 2017)
1934 – Bud Selig, 9th Major League Baseball Commissioner
1936 – Buddy Guy, American singer-songwriter and guitarist 
  1936   – Infanta Pilar, Duchess of Badajoz (d. 2020)
1938 – Hervé de Charette, French politician, French Minister of Foreign Affairs
  1938   – Terry O'Neill, English photographer (d. 2019)
1939 – Peter Bogdanovich, American actor, director, producer, and screenwriter (d. 2022)
  1939   – Eleanor Smeal, American activist, founded the Feminist Majority Foundation
1940 – Patricia Schroeder, American lawyer and politician
  1940   – Clive Sinclair, English businessman, founded Sinclair Radionics and Sinclair Research (d. 2021)
1941 – Paul Anka, Canadian singer-songwriter and actor
1942 – Pollyanna Pickering, English environmentalist and painter (d. 2018)
1943 – Henri-François Gautrin, Canadian physicist and politician
1944 – Gerry Birrell, Scottish race car driver (d. 1973)
  1944   – Peter Bottomley, English politician
  1944   – Frances de la Tour, English actress
1945 – Patrick Modiano, French novelist and screenwriter, Nobel Prize laureate
  1945   – David Sanborn, American saxophonist and composer
1946 – Neil Bonnett, American race car driver and sportscaster (d. 1994)
  1946   – Jeffrey Hammond, English bass player 
1947 – William Atherton, American actor and producer
  1947   – Françoise Barré-Sinoussi, French virologist and biologist, Nobel Prize laureate
  1947   – Jonathan Mann, American physician and author (d. 1998)
  1947   – Arnold Schwarzenegger, Austrian-American bodybuilder, actor, and politician, 38th Governor of California
1948 – Billy Paultz, American basketball player
  1948   – Jean Reno, Moroccan-French actor
  1948   – Otis Taylor, American singer-songwriter and guitarist
  1948   – Julia Tsenova, Bulgarian pianist and composer (d. 2010)
1949 – Duck Baker, American guitarist
  1949   – Sonia Proudman, English lawyer and judge
1950 – Harriet Harman, English lawyer and politician
  1950   – Frank Stallone, American singer-songwriter and actor
1951 – Alan Kourie, South African cricketer
  1951   – Gerry Judah, Indian-English painter and sculptor
1952 – Stephen Blackmore, English botanist and author
1954 – Ken Olin, American actor, director, and producer
1955 – Rat Scabies, English drummer and producer 
  1955   – Christopher Warren-Green, English violinist and conductor
1956 – Delta Burke, American actress
  1956   – Réal Cloutier, Canadian ice hockey player
  1956   – Georg Gänswein, German prelate, Prefect of the Pontifical Household, and former personal secretary to Pope Benedict XVI
  1956   – Anita Hill, American lawyer and academic
  1956   – Soraida Martinez, American painter and educator
1957 – Antonio Adamo,  Italian director and cinematographer
  1957   – Bill Cartwright, American basketball player and coach
  1957   – Clint Hurdle, American baseball player and manager
  1957   – Nery Pumpido, Argentinian footballer, coach, and manager
1958 – Kate Bush, English singer-songwriter and producer
1958 – Liz Kershaw, English radio broadcaster
  1958   – Daley Thompson, English decathlete and trainer
1960 – Jennifer Barnes, American-English musicologist and academic
  1960   – Richard Linklater, American director and screenwriter
  1960   – Brillante Mendoza, Filipino independent film director
1961 – Laurence Fishburne, American actor and producer
1962 – Alton Brown, American chef, author, and producer
  1962   – Jay Feaster, American ice hockey player and manager
  1962   – Yakub Memon, Indian accountant and terrorist (d. 2015)
1963 – Peter Bowler, English-Australian cricketer
  1963   – Lisa Kudrow, American actress and producer
  1963   – Antoni Martí, Andorran architect and politician
  1963   – Chris Mullin, American basketball player, coach, and executive
1964 – Ron Block, American singer-songwriter and banjo player
  1964   – Vivica A. Fox, American actress 
  1964   – Alek Keshishian, Lebanese-American director, producer, and screenwriter
  1964   – Jürgen Klinsmann, German footballer and manager
  1964   – Laine Randjärv, Estonian lawyer and politician, 6th Estonian Minister of Culture
1965 – Tim Munton, English cricketer
1966 – Kerry Fox, New Zealand actress and screenwriter
  1966   – Craig Gannon,  English guitarist and songwriter 
  1966   – Allan Langer, Australian rugby league player and coach
  1966   – Louise Wener, English author and singer-songwriter 
1968 – Robert Korzeniowski, Polish race walker and coach
  1968   – Sean Moore, Welsh drummer and songwriter 
1969 – Simon Baker, Australian actor, director, and producer
  1969   – Errol Stewart, South African cricketer and lawyer
1970 – Alun Cairns, Welsh businessman and politician
  1970   – Dean Edwards, American comedian, actor, and singer
  1970   – Christopher Nolan, English-American director, producer, and screenwriter
1971 – Elvis Crespo, American-Puerto Rican singer 
  1971   – Tom Green, Canadian comedian and actor
1972 – Jim McIlvaine, American basketball player and sportscaster
1973 – Kenton Cool, English mountaineer
  1973   – Ümit Davala, Turkish footballer and manager
  1973   – Anastasios Katsabis, Greek footballer
  1973   – Markus Näslund, Swedish ice hockey player and manager
  1973   – Sonu Nigam, Indian playback singer and actor
  1973   – Clementa C. Pinckney, American minister and politician (d. 2015)
1974 – Radostin Kishishev, Bulgarian footballer and manager
  1974   – Jason Robinson, English rugby league footballer, and rugby union footballer and coach
  1974   – Hilary Swank, American actress and producer
1975 – Graham Nicholls, English author and activist
  1975   – Kate Starbird, American basketball player and computer scientist
1977 – Diana Bolocco, Chilean model and journalist;
  1977   – Misty May-Treanor, American volleyball player and coach
  1977   – Jaime Pressly, American actress
  1977   – Bootsy Thornton, American basketball player
  1977   – Ian Watkins, Welsh singer-songwriter and child abuse convict
1979 – Carlos Arroyo, Puerto Rican basketball player and singer
  1979   – Chad Keegan, South African cricketer and coach
  1979   – Graeme McDowell, Northern Irish golfer
  1979   – Maya Nasser, Syrian journalist (d. 2012)
1980 – Seth Avett, American folk-rock singer-songwriter and musician 
  1980   – Justin Rose, South African-English golfer
1981 – Nicky Hayden, American motorcycle racer (d. 2017)
  1981   – Juan Smith, South African rugby union footballer
  1981   – Hope Solo, American soccer player
  1981   – Indrek Turi, Estonian decathlete
1982 – Jehad Al-Hussain, Syrian footballer
  1982   – James Anderson, English cricketer 
  1982   – Yvonne Strahovski, Australian actress
1983 – Seán Dillon, Irish footballer
1984 – Marko Asmer, Estonian race car driver
  1984   – Gabrielle Christian, American actress and singer
  1984   – Trudy McIntosh, Australian artistic gymnast
  1984   – Kevin Pittsnogle, American basketball player
1985 – Chris Guccione, Australian tennis player
  1985   – Daniel Fredheim Holm, Norwegian footballer
  1985   – Luca Lanotte, Italian ice dancer
  1985   – Matthew Scott, Australian rugby league player
1986 – Tiago Alencar, Brazilian footballer
  1986   – William Zillman, Australian rugby league player
1987 – Anton Fink, German footballer
  1987   – Sam Saunders, American golfer
1988 – Wen Chean Lim, Malaysian rhythmic gymnast
1989 – Aleix Espargaró, Spanish motorcycle racer
  1989   – Wayne Parnell, South African cricketer
1990 – Chris Maxwell, Welsh footballer
1991 – Diana Vickers, English singer-songwriter
1992 – Hannah Cockroft, English wheelchair racer
1993 – Jacob Faria, American baseball player
  1993   – André Gomes, Portuguese footballer 
  1993   – Margarida Moura, Portuguese tennis player
1994 – Nelydia Senrose, Malaysian actress
1996 – Nina Stojanović, Serbian tennis player

Deaths

Pre-1600
 578 – Jacob Baradaeus, Greek bishop
 579 – Pope Benedict I
 734 – Tatwine, English archbishop (b. 670)
 829 – Shi Xiancheng, general of the Tang Dynasty
1286 – Bar Hebraeus, Syrian scholar and historian (b. 1226)
1393 – Alberto d'Este, Lord of Ferrara and Modena (b. 1347)
1516 – John V, Count of Nassau-Siegen (b. 1455)
1540 – Thomas Abel, English priest and martyr (b. 1497)
  1540   – Robert Barnes, English martyr and reformer (b. 1495)
1550 – Thomas Wriothesley, 1st Earl of Southampton, English politician, Lord Chancellor of the United Kingdom (b. 1505)
1566 – Guillaume Rondelet, French doctor (b. 1507)

1601–1900
1608 – Rory O'Donnell, 1st Earl of Tyrconnell, last King of Tyrconnell (b. 1575)
1624 – Esmé Stewart, 3rd Duke of Lennox, British nobleman (b. 1579) 
1652 – Charles Amadeus, Duke of Nemours (b. 1624)
1680 – Thomas Butler, 6th Earl of Ossory, Irish admiral and politician, Lord Lieutenant of Ireland (b. 1634)
1683 – Maria Theresa of Spain (b. 1638)
1691 – Daniel Georg Morhof, German scholar and academic (b. 1639)
1700 – Prince William, Duke of Gloucester, English royal (b. 1689)
1718 – William Penn, English businessman and philosopher, founded the Province of Pennsylvania (b. 1644)
1771 – Thomas Gray, English poet (b. 1716)
1811 – Miguel Hidalgo y Costilla, Mexican priest and soldier (b. 1753)
1832 – Lê Văn Duyệt, Vietnamese general, mandarin (b. 1763–4)
1870 – Aasmund Olavsson Vinje, Norwegian poet and journalist (b. 1818) 
1875 – George Pickett, American general (b. 1825)
1889 – Charlie Absolom, England cricketer (b. 1846)
1898 – Otto von Bismarck, German lawyer and politician, 1st Chancellor of Germany (b. 1815)
1900 – Alfred, Duke of Saxe-Coburg and Gotha (b. 1844)

1901–present
1912 – Emperor Meiji of Japan (b. 1852)
1918 – Joyce Kilmer, American soldier, journalist, and poet (b. 1886)
1920 – Albert Gustaf Dahlman, Swedish executioner (b. 1848)
1930 – Joan Gamper, Swiss-Spanish footballer and businessman, founded FC Barcelona (b. 1877)
1938 – John Derbyshire, English swimmer and water polo player (b. 1878)
1941 – Hugo Celmiņš, Latvian politician, former Prime Minister of Latvia (b. 1877)
1947 – Joseph Cook, English-Australian miner and politician, 6th Prime Minister of Australia (b. 1860)
1965 – Jun'ichirō Tanizaki, Japanese author and playwright (b. 1886)
1970 – Walter Murdoch, Scottish-Australian academic (b. 1874)
  1970   – George Szell, Hungarian-American conductor and composer (b. 1897)
1971 – Thomas Hollway, Australian politician, 36th Premier of Victoria (b. 1906)
1975 – James Blish, American author and critic (b. 1921)
1977 – Emory Holloway, American scholar, author, and educator (b. 1885)
1983 – Howard Dietz, American songwriter and publicist (b. 1896)
  1983   – Lynn Fontanne, English actress (b. 1887)
1985 – Julia Robinson, American mathematician and theorist (b. 1919)
1989 – Lane Frost, American professional bull rider (b. 1963) 
1990 – Ian Gow, British Member of Parliament who was assassinated by the IRA (b. 1937)
1992 – Brenda Marshall, Filipino-American actress and singer (b. 1915)
  1992   – Joe Shuster, Canadian-American illustrator, co-created Superman (b. 1914)
1994 – Konstantin Kalser, German-American film producer and advertising executive (b. 1920)
1996 – Claudette Colbert, French-American actress (b. 1903)
1997 – Bảo Đại, Vietnamese emperor (b. 1913)
1998 – Buffalo Bob Smith, American television host (b. 1917)
2001 – Anton Schwarzkopf, German engineer (b. 1924)
2003 – Steve Hislop, Scottish motorcycle racer (b. 1962)
  2003   – Sam Phillips, American record producer, founded Sun Records (b. 1923)
2005 – Ray Cunningham, American baseball player (b. 1905)
  2005   – John Garang, Sudanese colonel and politician, 6th President of South Sudan (b. 1945)
2006 – Duygu Asena, Turkish journalist and author(b. 1946)
  2006   – Al Balding, Canadian golfer (b. 1924)
  2006   – Murray Bookchin, American philosopher and author (b. 1921)
  2006   – Anthony Galla-Rini, American accordion player and composer (b. 1904)
  2006   – Akbar Mohammadi, Iranian activist (b. 1972)
2007 – Michelangelo Antonioni, Italian director and screenwriter (b. 1912)
  2007   – Teoctist Arăpașu, Romanian patriarch (b. 1915)
  2007   – Ingmar Bergman, Swedish director, producer, and screenwriter (b. 1918)
  2007   – Bill Walsh, American football player and coach (b. 1931)
2008 – Anne Armstrong, American businesswoman and diplomat, United States Ambassador to the United Kingdom (b. 1927)
2009 – Mohammed Yusuf, Nigerian militant leader, founded Boko Haram (b. 1970)
  2009   – Peter Zadek, German director and screenwriter (b. 1926)
2011 – Bob Peterson, American basketball player (b. 1932)
2012 – Maeve Binchy, Irish author, playwright, and journalist (b. 1939)
  2012   – Bill Doss, American singer and guitarist (b. 1968)
  2012   – Stig Ossian Ericson, Swedish actor, director, and screenwriter (b. 1923)
  2012   – Les Green, English footballer and manager (b. 1941)
  2012   – Jonathan Hardy, New Zealand-Australian actor and screenwriter (b. 1940)
  2012   – Bill Kitchen, Canadian ice hockey player (b. 1960)
  2012   – Mary Louise Rasmuson, American colonel (b. 1911)
2013 – Cecil Alexander, American architect, designed the State of Georgia Building (b. 1918)
  2013   – Berthold Beitz, German businessman (b. 1913)
  2013   – Robert Neelly Bellah, American sociologist and author (b. 1927)
  2013   – Harry F. Byrd Jr., American lieutenant, publisher, and politician (b. 1914)
  2013   – Antoni Ramallets, Spanish footballer and manager (b. 1924)
  2013   – Ossie Schectman, American basketball player (b. 1919)
  2013   – Benjamin Walker, Indian-English author, poet, and playwright (b. 1913)
2014 – Robert Drew, American director and producer (b. 1924)
  2014   – Harun Farocki, German director, producer, and screenwriter (b. 1944)
  2014   – Julio Grondona, Argentinian businessman (b. 1931)
  2014   – Peter Hall, English geographer, author, and academic (b. 1932)
  2014   – Dick Smith, American make-up artist (b. 1922)
  2014   – Dick Wagner, American singer-songwriter and guitarist (b. 1942)
2015 – Lynn Anderson, American singer (b. 1947)
  2015   – Stuart Baggs, English businessman (b. 1988)
  2015   – Endel Lippmaa, Estonian physicist (b. 1930) 
  2015   – Francis Paul Prucha, American historian and academic (b. 1921)
  2015   – Alena Vrzáňová, Czech figure skater (b. 1931)
2016 – Gloria DeHaven, American actress, singer, and dancer (b. 1925)
2018 – Michael A. Sheehan, American author, former government official and military officer (b. 1955)
2020 – Lee Teng-hui, Taiwanese politician, President (1988–2000), Vice President (1984–1988) and mayor of Taipei (1978–1981) (b.1923)
  2020   – Herman Cain, American businessman and political activist (b. 1945) 
2021 – Shona Ferguson, Botswana-born, South African actor and executive producer (b. 1974)
2022 – Pat Carroll, American actress and comedian (b. 1927)
2022 – Nichelle Nichols, American actress, singer and dancer (b. 1932)

Holidays and observances
Christian feast day:
Abdon and Sennen 
Hatebrand
Maxima, Donatilla, and Secunda 
Peter Chrysologus
Robert Barnes (Lutheran)
Rufinus of Assisi
Tatwine
Ursus of Auxerre
Solanus Casey
July 30 (Eastern Orthodox liturgics)
Feast of the Throne (Morocco)
Independence Day, celebrates the independence of Vanuatu from the United Kingdom and France in 1980.
International Day of Friendship (international), and its related observances:
Día del Amigo (Paraguay) 
Martyrs Day (South Sudan)

References

External links

 
 
 

Days of the year
July